Graham Adams (1 March 1933 – 14 February 2020) was a football player and football coach. In 1971, he became the first foreign South Korea national football team assistant coach and technical advisor.(March 1971 ~ February 1972) After his coaching career in South Korea, he was appointed manager of the Montreal Olympique. In 1967, he led the Bermuda national football team to a silver medal at the Pan American Games. In 1974, he was the head coach for the Quebec Selects in the National Soccer League.

During his career as a player, he played for the Plymouth Argyle F.C. and Oxford United FC He died on February 14, 2020.

References 

1933 births
2020 deaths
English footballers
Association football midfielders
Plymouth Argyle F.C. players
Oxford United F.C. players
English Football League players
Canadian National Soccer League coaches
North American Soccer League (1968–1984) coaches
People from Great Torrington